Héctor Monsalve (born 13 July 1934) is a former Colombian cyclist. He competed in the team pursuit event at the 1956 Summer Olympics.

References

External links
 

1934 births
Living people
Colombian male cyclists
Olympic cyclists of Colombia
Cyclists at the 1956 Summer Olympics
Place of birth missing (living people)